is a Buddhist temple affiliated with Nichiren-shū located in the city of Hachiōji in western Tōkyō, Japan.

The temple is among those of the Hachiōji Shichifukujin Pilgrimage (八王子七福神めぐり), and enshrines the goddess Benzaiten. It was formerly associated with Honkoku-ji (本圀寺) of the Rokujōmon-ryū (六条門流) branch of Nichiren Buddhism.

History
1489 - The temple was established by Keiun Nicchō (啓運日澄) for his retirement.
1490 - Establishment formerly recognized within Hachiōji.
1590 - Relocated to Hiyoshi-chō

Temple grounds
 Main Hall
 Cemetery
 Inari Hall
Ema shelf (絵馬掛)
Picture guide, popularly known as 

Faith tradition
As is customary of Shinbutsu-shūgō tradition, Shinto kami are also enshrined at Ryōhō-ji such as Ugajin, an agricultural deity closely associated with the Buddhist deity Benzaiten. Inari Ōkami and Ukanomitama are both enshrined within the Inari Hall.

The temple has also enshrined Daikokuten and Ryūjin in an effort to expand its popularity.

Moe-ji
In May 2009, the temple installed an illustrated signboard featuring Buddhist and Shinto deities as anime characters, prompting the popular name . In order to provide a cheerful atmosphere for visitors, the enshrined , an eccentric, stylized form of the goddess, is presented through various forms of music and entertainment. The temple abbot was introduced to voice actress and illustrator Toromi, who went on to play the role of Benzaiten in cosplay, taking on the persona "Toro Benten."

August 2010 saw the release of a theme song for Ryōhō-ji, under the Ryōhō-j Records label created by music ensemble IOSYS.

References

External links

了法寺 Official website
かみたま 元了法寺 YouTube channel

15th-century Buddhist temples
Buddhist temples in Tokyo
Hachiōji, Tokyo
Nichiren-shū temples
Moe (slang)
Inari temples